Corviglia is a location on the eastern slopes of Piz Nair, overlooking St. Moritz in the canton of Graubünden. Corviglia is mainly accessible from the town by the St. Moritz–Corviglia funicular, via Chantarella. At Corviglia, an aerial tramway climbs west to Piz Nair, unloading slightly below its summit.

Corviglia is also the name of the ski area directly above St. Moritz. This area, together with the fully integrated Marguns area which is centered above the neighboring town of Celerina, is the largest skiing area in the Engadin. It hosted the alpine skiing events of the 1948 Winter Olympics and the World Championships in 1974 and 2003.

References

External links

 Corviglia website

Engadin
Mountains of the Alps
Mountains of Switzerland
Mountains of Graubünden
Two-thousanders of Switzerland
St. Moritz